Digicel IMAX is Trinidad and Tobago (and the Caribbean’s) first and only IMAX 3D movie theatre.

Digicel is the title sponsor. Other sponsors include Carib Brewery, Ansa Automotive, Atlantic LNG and First Citizens Bank.

The cinema is located at One Woodbrook Place, Port of Spain.

Digicel IMAX was launched by Ingrid Jahra, the founder of the Giant Screen Entertainment.

There were some legal disagreements with the developer; however, the theatre was opened in August 2011, and offers both Hollywood blockbuster movies as well as IMAX educational films, which are targeted mostly to schools in Trinidad and Tobago

See also
 List of IMAX venues

References

External links
Digicel IMAX Official Site
Digicel IMAX Facebook Site
Digicel IMAX on the IMAX Site

Cinemas in Trinidad and Tobago
IMAX venues